OCDS may refer to:

 Oxford Classical Drama Society, the funding body behind the triennial Oxford Greek Play
 Secular Order of Discalced Carmelites (Ordo Carmelitarum Discalceatorum Saecularis)
 Open Contracting Data Standard, a data standard for public contracting/tendering/procurement